Kukhan may refer to:
 Kukhan, Kurdistan
 Kukhan, West Azerbaijan